The 2014 Worthing Borough Council election took place on 22 May 2014 to elect members of  Worthing Borough Council in West Sussex, England. The election took place on the same day as elections to the European Parliament, and saw one third of the council up for election. The Conservative Party retained overall control of the council, gaining four seats, but losing one to the UK Independence Party. The Liberal Democrats suffered five losses, including one to the Green Party, who gaining their first elected seats on the Council.

Election result

Ward results

References

2014 English local elections
2014
2010s in West Sussex